Douglas N. C. Lin (born May 7, 1949) is Professor of Astronomy and Astrophysics at the University of California, Santa Cruz.  He was born in New York and grew up in Beijing. He earned his BSc from McGill University, his PhD from the Institute of Astronomy, Cambridge University, and performed postdoctoral research at both Harvard and Cambridge.  In 1979 he took an Assistant Professorship at UCSC, and has remained there since.  He is also the founding director of the Kavli Institute for Astronomy and Astrophysics at Peking University.

Douglas Lin's principal research interests are in the origin of the solar system, star formation, astrophysical fluid dynamics, dynamics of stellar clusters, structure of galaxies, active galactic nuclei, and galaxy formation.

As a mark of respect to his long history of contribution within astronomy, the Monash University recently held a Symposium titled Evolution of Planetary and Stellar Systems (nicknamed Linfest) in his honour. He also sits on the selection committee for the Astronomy award, given under the auspices of the Shaw Prize.

Awards
 Guggenheim Fellow
 Otto Schmidt Medal 
 von Humboldt Fellow
 Sackler Prize
 LExEN Award given by the National Science Foundation
 Member of selection committee from the Shaw Prize
 Member of American Academy of Arts and Sciences
 Founding Director, Kavli Institute for Astronomy and Astrophysics
 Brouwer Award (2014)
 Bruce Medal (2015)

Articles
 R. Spurzem, D. N. C. Lin   Orbit Evolution of Planetary Systems in Stellar Clusters  
 Ji-Lin Zhou and Douglas N. C. Lina   Migration and Final Location of Hot Super Earths in the Presence of Gas Giants
 Douglas N.C. Lin and Ian Dobbs-Dixon   Diversity of close-in planets and the interactions with their host stars 
 James Guillochon, Enrico Ramirez-Ruiz, Douglas N. C. Lin.   Consequences of the Disruption and Ejection of Giant Planets

References

External links
 At Long Last, a New Sun With a Family of Planets
 Found: 2 Planetary Systems. Result: Astronomers Stunned.
 Linfest  

1949 births
Living people
American astronomers
McGill University alumni
Alumni of the University of Cambridge
University of California, Santa Cruz faculty
Planetary scientists